I Can See Your Voice is a German television mystery music game show series based on the South Korean programme of the same name. Since its premiere on 18 August 2020, it has aired three seasons on RTL.

Gameplay

Format
Presented with a group of eight "mystery singers" identified only by their occupation, a guest artist and a group of two contestants must attempt to eliminate bad singers from the group without ever hearing them sing, assisted by clues and a celebrity panel over the course of four rounds. At the end of the game, the last remaining mystery singer is revealed as either good or bad by means of a duet between them and one of the guest artists.

Rewards
Until the second season, if the singer is good, the contestant wins ; if the singer is bad, the same amount is given to the bad singer instead.

For the third season, the contestants must eliminate one mystery singer at the end of each round, receiving  if they eliminate a bad singer. If the singer is bad, the contestants' winnings are given to the bad singer instead.

Rounds
Each episode presents the guest artist and contestants with eight people whose identities and singing voices are kept concealed until they are eliminated to perform on the "stage of truth" or remain in the end to perform the final duet.

Notes:

Production

Background and development
Mediengruppe RTL Deutschland first announced the development of the series in December 2019. It is produced by Tresor TV (under the property of Keshet International); the staff team is managed by executive producer Anja Heinen, producer Tina Allert, and director Markus Küttner.

Filming
Tapings for the programme took place at MMC Studios in Ehrenfeld, Cologne.

In the second season, the programme was filmed under health and safety protocols due to the COVID-19 pandemic. This resulted in prematurely ending the first season, as production halted after airing pilot episodes involving audience without such preemptive measures. In response, Tresor Productions spokesperson Jovan Evermann stated that they followed its guidelines according to the federal health department.

Broadcast
I Can See Your Voice debuted as back-to-back, separate pilot episodes on 18 and 19 August 2020. After the first season broadcasts, the series has been already renewed for the second season that premiered on 30 March 2021, a week after the fourth-season finale of ProSieben's rival show The Masked Singer.

Cast
The series employs a team of "celebrity panelists" who decipher mystery singers' evidences throughout the game. Alongside with full-timers and additional ones, guest panelists also appear since the second season. Throughout its broadcast, the programme has assigned 5 different panelists.

Daniel Hartwich (who was the show's host since the first season) appointed in the third-season premiere only due to being tested positive of COVID-19. For the rest of season, he was replaced by temporary hosts Oliver Geissen, Oliver Pocher, and Sonja Zietlow.

Series overview

Episodes

Season 1 (2020)

Season 2 (2021)

Season 3 (2022)

Notes

References

 
2020s German television series
2020 German television series debuts
German game shows
German television series based on South Korean television series
German-language television shows
RTL (German TV channel) original programming